Texier is a surname, and may refer to:

 Alexandre Texier, French professional ice hockey player
 Catherine Texier, French-American writer
 Félix Marie Charles Texier, French historian
 Henri Texier, French jazz bassist
Jehan Texier or Le Texier, better known as Jehan de Beauce, a 15th/16th-century French architect.
 Marie-Gustave-Victor-René-Alfred Texier (1882 - 1978), French general
 Texier (crew), French sailor, Olympic Games medalist
 Texier (helmsman), French sailor, Olympic Games medalist